{{DISPLAYTITLE:C6H12O2}}
The molecular formula C6H12O2 (Molar mass: 116.15 g/mol) may refer to:
 Butyl acetate
 sec-Butyl acetate
 tert-Butyl acetate
 Cyclohexane-1,2-diol, a chemical compound found in
 Diacetone alcohol
 Ethyl butyrate 
 Hexanoic acid
 Isobutyl acetate
 Methyl pentanoate
 4-Methylpentanoic acid
 3-Methylpentanoic acid
 2-Methylpentanoic acid
 2,2-Dimethylbutanoic acid
 2,3-Dimethylbutanoic acid
 3,3-Dimethylbutanoic acid
 Methyl pivalate
 Propyl propanoate